The 2016 season was the Carolina Panthers' 22nd in the National Football League and their sixth under head coach Ron Rivera. It was also the team's 20th season at Bank of America Stadium. The previous year, the Panthers achieved their highest win total in franchise history with a 15–1 record, but lost to the Denver Broncos in Super Bowl 50. They entered the 2016 season as the defending NFC champions and NFC South champions and hope to repeat as NFC champions.

After a 1–5 start, their worst start since 2012, the Panthers finished the season at 6–10, missing the playoffs for the first time since 2012. The Panthers struggled throughout the season with injuries and loss of star players via free agency and retirement. The Panthers became the first team in NFL history to go 15–1 and miss the playoffs the following year and the first Super Bowl runners up to miss the next year's playoffs since the 2008 Patriots. They also failed to win the NFC South for the first time in three seasons. This was also the first team to have at least 15 wins and finish last in their division the following season. They were eliminated from playoff contention in Week 16 when they lost to the Atlanta Falcons 33-16.

Offseason

The Panthers had the most explosive offense in the NFL in the regular season, despite having subpar tackle play. The team did not add any tackles in free agency though, with left tackle Michael Oher instead getting a three-year contract extension worth $21.6 million with $9.5 million guaranteed. The Panthers also had top wide receiver Kelvin Benjamin, who miss the entire 2015 season due to an ACL tear, returning from injury.

Another significant change in the off-season was the departure of starting cornerback Josh Norman. Norman was named First-team All-Pro in 2015 after allowing the lowest passer rating when targeted among NFL cornerbacks. The Panthers drafted corners James Bradberry, Daryl Worley and Zack Sanchez to compensate for the loss. The team also lost Dwan Edwards, a rotational defensive tackle, in free agency and veteran defensive end Jared Allen to retirement. They drafted defensive lineman Vernon Butler in the first round  to add more talent to that position group.

Draft

Notes
 The Panthers traded a conditional sixth-round selection to the Chicago Bears in exchange for defensive end Jared Allen.

Staff

Final roster

Schedule

Preseason

Regular season

Note: Intra-division opponents are in bold text.

Game summaries

Week 1: at Denver Broncos
NFL Kickoff game

The Panthers were up 17–7 in the fourth quarter which saw the Broncos put up 14 points. Down 21–20, Graham Gano attempted a potential game winning 50 yard kick but the ball flew wide left, handing the Panthers a 0–1 start to the season.

Week 2: vs. San Francisco 49ers

In their home opener, the Panthers looked to win their first game of the season. Carolina went into the fourth quarter with a 21-point lead over the 49ers; with about eight minutes left in the game, San Francisco managed to get within seven of tying the game. Carolina ended up scoring three more times before the game finished and won 46–27, improving to 1–1 on the year.

Week 3: vs. Minnesota Vikings

The Panthers' fourteen home game winning streak came to an end after losing to Minnesota. They fell to 1–2 as Cam Newton was sacked eight times by the Minnesota defense and threw three picks.

Week 4: at Atlanta Falcons

It was not Carolina's day as the defense had a very hard time putting pressure on Matt Ryan, who threw for 500 yards and four touchdowns, one of them to Julio Jones, who had a monster game, catching 12 passes for 300 yards. It was another rough day for Newton, who left the game with a concussion in the fourth quarter, allowing backup QB Derek Anderson into action. Anderson threw both a pair of touchdowns and interceptions as the Panthers would drop to 1–3.

Week 5: vs. Tampa Bay Buccaneers

After being held scoreless in the first half, the Panthers scored two touchdowns in the third quarter. Tampa Bay followed up with a touchdown to tie the game. Late in the fourth quarter, the Buccaneers made a field goal to win 17–14. With the loss the Panthers fall to 1–4.

Week 6: at New Orleans Saints

With Cam Newton returning from a concussion, the Panthers urged a late comeback and tied the game at 38–38, but New Orleans kicker Wil Lutz hit the gamewinner to seal the 41–38 victory for the Saints. With the loss the Panthers drop to 1–5, their worst record since 2012.

Week 7: Bye week
No game. Carolina had their bye week on Week 7.

Week 8: vs. Arizona Cardinals

The Panthers returned from their bye week for a rematch of the previous year's NFC Championship game, in which the Panthers defeated the Cardinals 49–15. The Panthers went up 24–7 before halftime and maintained their lead to win the game 30–20, giving them their second win of the season and a 2–5 record. The game was flexed out of a 4:25 time slot.

Week 9: at Los Angeles Rams

After the Panthers went into the fourth quarter with a seven-point lead, Graham Gano kicked a field goal making it 10–0. After both teams kicked field goals, and with less than two minutes left in the game, Los Angeles scored a touchdown, but the Panthers manage to win 13–10 improving to 3–5.

Week 10: vs. Kansas City Chiefs

The Panthers went into the fourth quarter with a 17–3 lead over the Chiefs but things changed when Cairo Santos kicked a field goal, and Eric Berry had a pick six. Santos makes another field goal, tying the game at 17. In the Panthers' last possession of the game, the ball was stripped out of Kelvin Benjamin's hands and Kansas City gets the ball back. Santos makes the game-winning field goal for the Chiefs, and the Panthers fall to 3–6.

Week 11: vs. New Orleans Saints

After their embarrassing 17-point comeback loss four days prior, the Panthers hosted the Saints in a Thursday Night 'Color Rush' Matchup. Just like in the Chiefs game, the Panthers went into the fourth quarter holding New Orleans to only three points. They had a 23–3 lead but the Saints managed to rally and get within three with 5:11 left in the game. Late in the fourth quarter star linebacker Luke Kuechly left the game and was evaluated for a concussion. The Panthers were able to hold off New Orleans and win 23–20, improving to 4–6.

Week 12: at Oakland Raiders

Carolina had a rough start in the first half, only scoring seven points, and went into halftime seventeen points behind Oakland. They turned things around and had an explosive third quarter scoring eighteen points giving them a one-point lead over the Raiders. In the fourth quarter the Panthers went on to score seven but the Raiders answered back tying the game. In their last possession of the game the ball was taken from Cam Newton giving Oakland the ball back. Carolina could not hold on as Oakland kicked a field goal winning the game. They fall to 4–7.

Week 13: at Seattle Seahawks

The Panthers were defeated by the Seahawks 40–7, and fell to 4–8.

Week 14: vs. San Diego Chargers

The Panthers managed to win at home, defeating San Diego 28–16. They improved to 5–8.

Week 15: at Washington Redskins

In their second Monday Night Football game of the season, the Panthers took on the Washington Redskins at FedExField in Landover, Maryland. Carolina defeated Washington 26–15, and kept their slim chances of making the playoffs alive by improving to 6–8.

Week 16: vs. Atlanta Falcons
 With the loss, the Panthers fell to 6–9, officially eliminating them from the playoffs. They are the first team to go 15–1 the previous season and miss the playoffs the next season, as well as the first Super Bowl runner-up to miss the playoffs since the 2008 Patriots.

Week 17: at Tampa Bay Buccaneers

Carolina attempted to win on a game-winning 2-point attempt but Newton's pass failed, giving the Bucs a narrow 17–16 victory. The Panthers finish the season at 6–10, the worst record for a team that went 15–1 the previous season.

Standings

Division

Conference

References

External links

 

Carolina
Carolina Panthers seasons
Carolina Panthers